Mava in Kermanshah Province may refer to:
Mava-ye Olya
Mava-ye Sofla